The Drake River is a river of New Zealand. It is located in southern Westland, and flows entirely within the Mount Aspiring National Park. The river follows a southerly course for seven kilometres before turning northeast to flow another five kilometres before reaching the Waiatoto River.

The tributaries of the river were probably surveyed and named by Mueller in 1885.

There is potential for a 30 MW power-generating plant at the junction of the Drake and Waiatoto Rivers.

See also
List of rivers of New Zealand

References

Land Information New Zealand - Search for Place Names

Westland District
Rivers of the West Coast, New Zealand
Mount Aspiring National Park
Rivers of New Zealand